The 2014 Thai Premier League (also known as Toyota Thai Premier League due to the sponsorship from Toyota) is the 18th season of the Thai Premier League since its establishment in 1996. A total of 20 teams are competing in the league. The season has begun on 22 February and will finish on 2 November.

Buriram United are the defending champions, having won their Thai Premier League title the previous season. Air Force Central, Singhtarua and PTT Rayong entered as the three promoted teams.

Teams
A total of 20 teams will contest the league, including 17 sides from the 2013 season and three promoted from the 2013 Thai Division 1 League.

Pattaya United were relegated to the 2014 Thai Division 1 League after finishing the 2013 season. They were replaced by the best three teams from the 2013 Thai Division 1 League champions Air Force Central, runners-up Singhtarua and third place PTT Rayong.

Stadiums locations

Note: Table lists in alphabetical order.

  1 Osotspa Saraburi will use the Rajamangala Stadium as their temporary home whilst their home stadium, Saraburi Stadium's floodlights are upgraded.
  2 Samut Songkhram used the Ratchaburi Stadium and Thai Army Sports Stadium until its floodlight is upgraded and the stadium is improved.

Personnel and sponsoring
Note: Flags indicate national team as has been defined under FIFA eligibility rules. Players may hold more than one non-FIFA nationality.

Managerial changes

Foreign players
The number of foreign players is restricted to seven per TPL team, but only five of them can be on the game sheet in each game. A team can use four foreign players on the field in each game, including at least one player from the AFC country.

League table

Results

Season statistics

Top scorersAs of 2 November 2014.Top assistsAs of 2 November 2014.''

Hat-tricks

Awards

Monthly awards

Annual awards

Player of the Year
The Player of the Year was awarded to Suchao Nuchnum.

Coach of the Year
The Coach of the Year was awarded to Masahiro Wada.

Golden Boot
The Golden Boot of the Year was awarded to Heberty.

Fair Play
The Fair Play of the Year was awarded to Songkhla United.

Attendances

See also
 2014 Thai Division 1 League
 2014 Regional League Division 2
 2014 Thai FA Cup
 2014 Thai League Cup
 2014 Kor Royal Cup
 Thai Premier League All-Star Football

References

2014
1